T. tricolor  may refer to:
 Terebra tricolor, a sea snail species
 Tetrisia tricolor, a moth species found in tropical South America
 Tillandsia tricolor, a plant species native to Costa Rica and Mexico
 Thyroptera tricolor, the Spix's disk-winged bat, a bat species found from south Mexico to Bolivia

Synonyms
 Thymallus tricolor, a synonym for Thymallus arcticus, the Arctic grayling, a  freshwater fish species

See also
 Tricolor (disambiguation)